"Dami Duro" is a song by Nigerian singer Davido. It was released as the second single from his debut studio album, Omo Baba Olowo (2012). It peaked at number 1 on Gold Myne's list of the top 10 songs of 2012, surpassing Iyanya's "Kukere". "Dami Duro" won Hottest Single of the Year at the 2012 Nigeria Entertainment Awards. It was nominated for Best Pop Single and Song of the Year at The Headies 2012. The music video for the song won Most Gifted Newcomer Video of the Year and was nominated for Most Gifted Dance Video of the Year at the 2012 Channel O Music Video Awards. The music video was also nominated for Best African Act Video at the 2012 4Syte TV Music Video Awards. Davido won Best Video by a New Artiste at the 2012 Nigeria Music Video Awards for "Dami Duro".

Remix
The remix of "Dami Duro" features Senegalese American singer Akon. In a brief interview with Blue Revolution Entertainment in Miami, Davido said the remix of "Dami Duro" was recorded in May 2012. A writer for Africa Public commended both artists for their work on the remix, saying, "I like the new verse, it gave a new vibe to the track, plus I couldn't easily tell which voice belonged to Davido and which one belonged to Akon. Apart from the fact that auto tune makes their voice sound more similar; Akon actually did well when it came to the Yoruba aspect."

Music video, impact and live performances
The music video for "Dami Duro" was released on January 8, 2012. It was directed in Lagos by Clarence Peters and was released during the Occupy Nigeria protests.

The popularity of "Dami Duro" extended to the political world. Former Oyo State governor Abiola Ajimobi sang the song while giving a speech at the University of Ibadan. In December 2013, Davido performed "Dami Duro" at a concert sponsored by a brewing company. The concert was held at the Kyadondo Rugby Club in Kampala and featured an additional performance by Jose Chameleon. During his performance, Davido paid tribute to the late Nelson Mandela.

Accolades

Covers and remixes 
Digital download
"Dami Duro" (Sai Phifer featuring Victoria Kimani and Archapello) - 4:16
"Dami Duro" (Mayorkun cover) - 4:10
"Dance Azonto" (Mr Eazi cover) - 3:54

Release history

References

External links

2013 singles
2013 songs
Davido songs
Akon songs
Song recordings produced by Shizzi
Yoruba-language songs
Songs written by Davido